Social Call is an album by saxophonist Houston Person which was recorded in 2003 and released on the HighNote label.

Reception

On All About Jazz, Jeff Stockton noted "Social Call is the mellow sound of the music as it used to be done. Even those who are indifferent to jazz, or even dislike jazz, can't help but enjoy this". In JazzTimes, David Franklin wrote: "Houston Person’s Social Call showcases breathy, subtone tenor. Indeed, beautiful melodies, lovingly caressed by Person’s sultry horn, constitute a generous portion of this recording. Slow tunes ... make up more than half the 11 tracks. Person treats them all with a lyrical sensitivity that allows the venerable melodies to speak for themselves". The Guardian selected it as their Jazz CD of the Week with Dave Gelly commenting "The whole thing is so agreeable that it's hard to pick bits out, but Person's firm, warm, unflappable ballad playing is a particular delight"

Track listing 
 "Social Call" (Gigi Gryce) – 5:25
 "If You Could See Me Now" (Tadd Dameron, Carl Sigman) – 5:42
 "Juicy Lucy" (Horace Silver) – 5:51
 "Evening Star" (Benny Carter) – 4:59
 "The End of a Love Affair" (E. C. Redding) – 5:12
 "Bewitched" (Richard Rodgers, Lorenz Hart) – 4:39
 "I'll Let You Know" (Cedar Walton) – 4:46
 "Stolen Sweets" (Wild Bill Davis, Dan Thompson) – 5:09
 "Day Dream" (Billy Strayhorn, Duke Ellington, John La Touche) – 4:59
 "Easy Walker" (Teddi Lastion) – 4:48
 "Some Other Spring" (Arthur Herzog Jr., Irene Kitchings) – 4:42

Personnel 
Houston Person – tenor saxophone
Stan Hope – piano
Paul Bollenback − guitar
Per-Ola Gadd – bass
Chip White – drums

References 

Houston Person albums
2003 albums
HighNote Records albums
Albums recorded at Van Gelder Studio